Mohania is a city and corresponding community development block in Kaimur district of Bihar, India. It serves as headquarters for the Mohania sub-division in Kaimur district. The bank of the Durgavati River is just to the south of Mohania. The total block population was 218,479, in 32,198 households.

Mohania is the hub of transport routes in Kaimur district. The famous temple Mundeshawari Devi is situated in Kaimur district.

Geography and climate

Geography 

Climate 
Mohania experiences a humid subtropical climate with large variations between summer and winter temperatures. Winters in Mohania see very large diurnal variations, with warm days and downright cold nights. The dry summer starts in April and lasts until June, followed by the monsoon season from July to October. Vk Cold waves from the Himalayan region cause temperatures to dip across the city in the winter from December to February and temperatures below  are not uncommon. Fog is common in the winters, while hot dry winds, called loo, blow in the summers.

Transport 
Mohania is well connected by air, rail and road with the major Indian cities like New Delhi, Mumbai, Kolkata, Chennai, Pune, Ahmedabad, Indore, Bhopal, Bhubaneswar, Gwalior, Jabalpur, Ujjain, Jaipur, Patna, Jamshedpur, Hyderabad etc. One of the major factors in Mohania's sustained existence as an inhabited city is its role as an established transportation hub between different cities.
It is a subdivisional town in Kaimur district. The district headquarters, Bhabua, is  southward from the railway station.

Road 
 National Highway 19 (NH 2 old) (GT Road): crosses through the heart of the city.
National Highway 219 : originates from the city and connect Bhabhua, Chainpur, Chand, Chandauli
National Highway 319 (NH 30 old): originates from this city and connect Dinara, Charpokhari, NH922 near Arrah (near capital Patna)
National Highway 319A (SH-14): originates from this city and connecting Ramgarh, Chausa and terminating at its junction with NH124C near Buxar.

Earlier state highway SH-14 was connected to Buxar via Ramgarh from the south and with Bhabua (District capital, [Audhaura, Bhagwanpur) from the south.

Railway 
The name of the railway station of Mohania is Bhabua Road railway station, situated on Howrah–Gaya–Mughalsarai–New Delhi Grand Cord line.
The station code is "BBU".

Airport 
Lal Bahadur Shastri International Airport, Varanasi, commonly known as Babatpur Airport, is the nearest airport,  from Mohania. Indian carriers, including Air India, Kingfisher Airlines, Spicejet, and international carriers like Air India, Thai Airways International, Korean Air and Naaz Airlines operate from here.

Education 
Schools include Jawahar Navodaya Vidyalaya, Chaurasia, Ramgarh Road

Worship places 

 Mundeshwari Temple,  from nearest city Bhabhua
 Hanuman Mandir Staion Road
 Sati Mai Temple near Railway stattion
 Hanuman Mandir at Chandani Chowk

Near by Visiting places 
 Mundeshwari Temple at a distance of 
 Telhar Kund, at a distance of 
 Karkat Waterfall at a distance of 
 Jagdahwa Dam at a distance of

Misc 
 Big Bazaar
 LIC India

Villages 
Mohania block contains the following 208 villages:

References 

 Census of India 2001: Data from the 2001 Census, including cities, villages and towns (Provisional). Census Commission of India. Archived from the original on 2004-06-16. Retrieved 2008-11-01.

Cities and towns in Kaimur district